The 2012 Belarusian First League is the 22nd season of 2nd level football in Belarus. It started in April and finished in November 2012.

Team changes from 2011 season
The winners of last season (Slavia Mozyr) were promoted to Belarusian Premier League. They were replaced by last-placed team of 2011 Belarusian Premier League table (Dnepr Mogilev).

The runners-up of last season (Partizan Minsk) won the promotion/relegation play-off against Vitebsk (11th-placed Premier League team). Partizan Minsk were thus promoted to Premier League and replaced in the First League by Vitebsk.

Two teams that finished at the bottom of 2011 season table (Belcard Grodno and Baranovichi) relegated to the Second League. They were replaced by two best teams of 2011 Second League (Bereza-2010 and Lida).

Klechesk Kletsk withdrew from the league due to lack of financing and joined Second League. No team was invited to replace them and the league was reduced to 15 teams for the season.

Teams and venues

League table

Promotion play-offs
The 11th placed team of 2012 Premier League (Torpedo-BelAZ Zhodino) played a two-legged relegation play-off against the runners-up of 2012 Belarusian First League Gorodeya for one spot in the 2013 Premier League and won the series 4–1 on aggregate.

Results

Top goalscorers

Updated to games played on 17 November 2012 Source: football.by

See also
2012 Belarusian Premier League
2011–12 Belarusian Cup
2012–13 Belarusian Cup

External links
 Official site 

Belarusian First League seasons
2
Belarus
Belarus